In Turkey, state-owned enterprises are called "Kamu İktisadi Teşebbüsü" or abbreviation "KİT".

List

References

 
Turkey
Companies of Turkey
Companies